Helichrysum milfordiae, the Milford everlasting, is a species of flowering plant in the family Asteraceae, native to South Africa. The white flower bracts have pink undersides which are prominent in bud.

In cultivation this plant is hardy down to  but requires the sharp drainage and dry winters of its native habitat, on scree slopes above  in the Drakensberg of Natal and Lesotho. It is suitable for cultivation in an Alpine garden or similar, with neutral or alkaline soil. In the UK it has gained the Royal Horticultural Society’s Award of Garden Merit.

References

milfordiae